Saraburi TRU Football Club (Thai สโมสรฟุตบอลสระบุรี ทีอาร์ยู), is a Thai semi professional football new club based in Saraburi. The club was formed in 2015 and entered the Regional League Division 2 and allocated into the Central & East Division from Derby match province project.

In 2017, licensing of this club didn't pass so the club was suspended 1 years.

Stadium and locations

Season by season record

References

External links
Facebook.com

Association football clubs established in 2015
Football clubs in Thailand
Saraburi province
2015 establishments in Thailand